Mixaylovka is a village and the least populous municipality in the Goygol Rayon of Azerbaijan.  It has a population of 146.

References 

Populated places in Goygol District